The word "Izumi-ku" may refer to:

Izumi-ku, Yokohama is one of the wards of Yokohama City, Japan
Izumi-ku, Sendai is one of the wards of Sendai City, Japan